West Point Press is a university press affiliated with the United States Military Academy (colloquially known as "West Post"), which is located in West Point, New York. The press was launched in 2023 to publish academic journals, monographs, and digital textbooks, among other works. West Point Press is currently an introductory member of the Association of University Presses.

See also

 List of English-language book publishing companies
 List of university presses

References

External links 
West Point Press

West Point Press
New York